Motorized tricycles are three-wheeled vehicles based on the same technology as bicycles or motorcycles, and powered by motorcycle or scooter engines or electric motors.

Motorized tricycle may also refer to:
 Auto rickshaw
 Motorized tricycle (Philippines)
 Electric rickshaw
 Electric trike
 Steam tricycle

See also
 Tricycle (disambiguation)
 Trike (disambiguation)